Charles Cottalorda (11 September 1900 – 3 May 1994) was a French racing cyclist. He rode in the 1929 Tour de France.

References

1900 births
1994 deaths
French male cyclists
Place of birth missing